István Mészáros (born 3 March 1980 in Szekszárd) is a Hungarian football player who currently plays for Paksi SE.

References
Profile at HLSZ
Profile at MLSZ

1980 births
Living people
People from Szekszárd
Hungarian footballers
Association football midfielders
Szekszárdi UFC footballers
Paksi FC players
Sportspeople from Tolna County